Event: Giant slalom Men

Date: 14 February 2007

1st run start time: 10:00 CET

2nd run start time: 13:00 CET

Results

Notes 

Men's Giant Slalom